Goodbye Ellston Avenue is the debut studio album by the American punk rock band Pinhead Gunpowder. It was released on February 25, 1997, through Lookout! Records. The album was re-released on vinyl and CD through Recess Records. It is the only studio album by Pinhead Gunpowder to date.

Critical reception
Kerrang! called the album "Billie Joe at his punk-rock best."

Track listing

Personnel
 Aaron Cometbus – drums
 Billie Joe Armstrong – vocals, guitar
 Jason White – vocals, guitar
 Bill Schneider – bass, vocals

Production
 Kevin Army – production
 John Golden - mastering
 Aaron Cometbus - graphic design, cover art
 Bill Schneider - photography

References

Pinhead Gunpowder albums
1997 albums
Lookout! Records albums